Retigyra iheringi is a species of sea snail, a marine gastropod mollusk, unassigned in the superfamily Seguenzioidea.

Description

Distribution
This species occurs in the Atlantic Ocean off the Azores.

References

 Warén A., 1992: New and little known "Skeneimorph" gastropods from the Mediterranean Sea and the adjacent Atlantic Ocean; Bollettino Malacologico 27(10–12): 149–248
 Gofas, S.; Le Renard, J.; Bouchet, P. (2001). Mollusca, in: Costello, M.J. et al. (Ed.) (2001). European register of marine species: a check-list of the marine species in Europe and a bibliography of guides to their identification. Collection Patrimoines Naturels, 50: pp. 180–213

ihering
Gastropods described in 1897